The Maner river or Manair or Maneru (Marathi : मानेर)(Telugu: మానేరు) is a tributary to the Godavari River in India. The Lower Maner Dam built across this river provides drinking water to Karimnagar, Telangana and also to the NTPC power plant at Ramagundam. Mid Manair Dam was constructed at Manvada village near Sircilla and upper Manair Dam was constructed during Nizam period near Narmala village in Gambhiraopet mandal of Rajanna Sircilla district.

Rivers of Telangana
Tributaries of the Godavari River
Rivers of India